Vriesea neoglutinosa is a plant species in the genus Vriesea. This species is endemic to Brazil.

References

neoglutinosa
Flora of Brazil